Varisi is an indigenous language of Choiseul Province, Solomon Islands.

External links 
 Paradisec has a number of collections that include Varisi language materials.

References

Languages of the Solomon Islands
Northwest Solomonic languages